Peter Day is a former broadcaster on BBC Radio 4 and the BBC World Service.

Early life and education
Day was educated at Lincoln School, at the time a boys-only grammar school, from 1957 to 1964 as a boarder. His father was a manager with Midland Bank (which became HSBC in 1999) in Lincolnshire (Horncastle and Gainsborough). He studied English at St Edmund Hall, Oxford.

Day was trained on the International Publishing Corporation (Daily Mirror Group) newspaper training scheme in south Devon. He worked at the Daily Record from 1970 to 1974 in Glasgow.

Career
Day joined BBC Radio News in 1974 in London, joining business news in 1975.

In 1983, he left the BBC to join TV-am as their economics and industrial correspondent, appearing as a reporter on the first day of broadcast - 1 February 1983.

He returned to the BBC to become a presenter and producer for the Financial World Tonight, which became part of The World Tonight.

Day presented In Business from 1988. On the World Service he presented its sister programme, Global Business, on weekends from 2000. He became Business Correspondent of the BBC in 1990, and in 1997 provided the business section for the Today programme.

On 1 September 2016 Peter Day presented his last ever In Business programme after 28 years.
He also wrote his last article for the BBC website on 26 May 2016.

Awards and honours
Day has won the Harold Wincott Award for broadcast business journalism three times, in 1989, 2000 and 2002. He received the Work Foundation lifetime achievement award in 2006. In 2007, it was revealed that In Business had become a surprise podcast hit, beating The Best of The Chris Moyles Show, the Today programme and In Our Time as the BBC's most downloaded podcast.

References

Year of birth missing (living people)
Living people
People from Lincolnshire
English radio presenters
BBC World Service people
Alumni of St Edmund Hall, Oxford
BBC newsreaders and journalists
British business and financial journalists
People educated at Lincoln Grammar School
Guild of St George